James Porter Moreland (born March 9, 1948), better known as J. P. Moreland, is an American philosopher, theologian, and  Christian apologist. He currently serves as a Distinguished Professor of Philosophy at Talbot School of Theology at Biola University in La Mirada, California.

Biography
Moreland specializes in metaphysics, philosophy of mind, and Christian philosophy, having had his work published in journals such as Metaphilosophy and the American Philosophical Quarterly. He has also had his work published by presses such as Intervarsity Press, NavPress, Zondervan, Oxford University Press, Routledge, Rutgers University Press, and Prometheus.

Moreland earned his undergraduate degree from the University of Missouri and a Master of Arts in philosophy with highest honors from the University of California, Riverside. He received his Th.M. in Theology from Dallas Theological Seminary. In 1985, he received a Ph.D. in philosophy from the University of Southern California. His dissertation was Universals and the Qualities of Things: A defense of Realism. His dissertation advisor was  Dallas Willard.   Moreland is married to Hope and together they have two children and four grandchildren.

Career
Moreland teaches at the Talbot School of Theology at Biola University in La Mirada, California. He is a member of the Board of Advisors for the Center on Culture and Civil Society at the Independent Institute. He served for eight years as a bioethicist for Personal Care Nursing Homes, Inc. in Baltimore, Maryland.

He has debated Clancy Martin over the existence of God as well as Canadian philosopher Kai Nielsen and Eddie Tabash on whether the supernatural exists. He has been a frequent guest on the PBS television series Closer to Truth.

Views
Moreland is a substance dualist, and also defends libertarian free will, as well as life after death. Moreland has defended the existence of angels and demons, arguing that he knows they exist due to both Christian doctrine and personal experience. He is an old earth creationist who is a critic of fideism.

In 2017, Moreland signed the Nashville Statement.

Awards and honors

Awarded fellowship for Ph.D. in nuclear chemistry, University of Colorado (1970).
Rollin Thomas Chafer Award in Christian Apologetics, Dallas Seminary (1978–79).
Academic Excellence Award, International School of Theology (1982–83).
Winner of the Outstanding Professor of the Year Award, Lakin School of Religion, Liberty University, (1988–89).
Elected as a Member of the executive committee for the Society of Christian Philosophers, (1997–99).
Fellow of the Center for the Renewal of Science & Culture, Discovery Institute. (2000–present)
Winner of the Robert Fischer Faculty Member of the Year Award, Biola University,(1998–99).
Member of the advisory board for Philosophia Christi, (1999 to 2003).
Member of the executive committee for the Evangelical Philosophical Society (1999-2003, 2006 to present).
Fellow of the Wilberforce Forum, 2001 to present.

Works
Moreland has authored or edited numerous publications, including:

Books

Edited by

Chapters

See also
American philosophy
List of American philosophers

References

External links
Official Websites
 J. P. Moreland's personal website
 J. P. Moreland's official Facebook page
 Faculty page of J. P. Moreland
 J. P. Moreland (Theopedia)

Debates

Closer to Truth
 
 
 
 

Other Talks
 
 
 

American philosophers
Biola University faculty
Christian apologists
Protestant philosophers
Living people
1948 births
American Christian theologians
American Christian creationists
Christian Old Earth creationists
University of Southern California alumni
Critics of atheism
Writers about religion and science
Distinguished professors of philosophy